David Schraven (born 1970 in Bottrop, Germany) is a German journalist. From 2010 to 2014, he was head of investigations at Funke Mediengruppe, one of the largest European media holdings for regional newspapers including Westdeutsche Allgemeine Zeitung. From 2007 to September 2014, he was treasurer of German association of investigative journalists Netzwerk Recherche. Since June 2014, he has been publisher of Correctiv - the first nonprofit investigative newsroom in the German-speaking world, founded in December 2013.

Career 

He was the founder of the German Newspaper "taz ruhr". Later he worked as a reporter on energy issues for the Axel Springer Group. Then in 2010 he went on with his researches as head of investigations at Funke Mediengruppe.

Schraven published several reports about the German military action by the Bundeswehr in Afghanistan. In 2011 he explained the details of the Operation Halmazag. In 2012 he published his investigation of the German military actions in Afghanistan on a special website with leaked documents. His graphic reportage "Kriegszeiten" was nominated for the international youth book award in Germany.

He worked on different reference books about investigative journalism for the German association of investigative journalists Netzwerk Recherche. The books "Reporter im verdeckten Einsatz (PDF)" deals with undercover research methods and "Kritischer Wirtschaftsjournalismus (PDF)" focuses on investigative business journalism.

In Dezember 2013 he founded CORRECTIV (correctiv.org) - the first nonprofit investigative newsroom in the German-speaking world. Correctiv has an education program to pass on investigative journalism methods. This should help to empower citizens to gain access to information and promote transparency. Besides that, CORRECTIV is focused on investigating corruption and datajournalism. In cooperation with various media, CORRECTIV shares its investigations and stories with large and small newspapers and magazines as well as with radio and TV stations.

Awards 

During his career as an investigative reporter Schraven won several prices for his investigative stories. He comes in third on the best known award for investigative journalism in Germany called Wächterpreis for his investigation of toxic drinking water. Then he won the Suisse "Fichtnerpreis" for his research about a corrupt politician. 2015 he was awarded Grimme Online Award for overseeing the investigation into downing Flug MH17. He also won the Deutschen Reporterpreis for his book "Weisse Wölfe" (illustrations by Jan Feindt).

Books 

 2009: Publisher and Author Undercover : Reporter im verdeckten Einsatz, Netzwerk Recherche, Wiesbaden, 
 2011: Author Graphic Novell Die wahre Geschichte vom Untergang der Alexander Kielland, Carlsen Verlag, with Vincent Burmeister (Artist)
 2012: Author graphic reportage Kriegszeiten, Carlsen Verlag, nominated for the international youth book award Deutschen Jugendliteraturpreis 2013, with Vincent Burmeister (Artist)
 2014: Zechenkinder: 25 Geschichten über das schwarze Herz des Ruhrgebiets, Ankerherz-Verlag, with Uwe Weber (Fotograf)
 2015: Author Graphic Novell WEISSE WÖLFE. Eine graphische Reportage über rechten Terror, CORRECTIV, with Jan Feindt (Artist), .
 2018: Author Graphic Novell Unter Krähen: Aus dem Inneren der Republik, CORRECTIV, with Vincent Burmeister, (Artist) .
 2020: Publisher Corona: Geschichte eines angekündigten Sterbens, DTV, with Cordt Schnibben .
 2022: Author Was wir wollen, CORRECTIV .

References

External links 
Articles by David Schraven (WAZ Investigation Team)
Profile on correctiv.org
Profile on German Business Network Xing

German journalists
German male journalists
1970 births
Living people
German male writers